The Pontiac Streamliner is a full-size car produced under the Pontiac brand by General Motors from 1932 until 1952.  A mass produced and popular vehicle, it was a significant luxury car during the recovery from the Great Depression, and during and immediately after the Second World War.

Pontiac Straight 8

Series 601
For model year 1933, Pontiac introduced the all-new Economy Eight Series 601 with the  Silver Streak Straight-8 using a Carter one-barrel carburetor and shared the slanting vee-type grille that concealed the radiator used on all GM products, and was built on the GM A platform shared with the Chevrolet Master. The front fenders now fully covered the front wheels and adopted aircraft-inspired appearance as a result of Art Deco influences. 1933 was also the first year all GM vehicles were installed with optional vent windows which were initially called “No Draft Individually Controlled Ventilation” later renamed "Ventiplanes" which the patent application was filed on Nov. 28, 1932. It was assigned to the Ternstedt Manufacturing Company, a GM subsidiary that manufactured components for Fisher Body. The feature redirected airflow into the passenger compartment along with side windows that would retract into the front doors. The engine abandoned the flathead V8 offered in 1932 and reverted to the straight-eight architecture which was engineered internally by Pontiac, while the 3-speed syncromesh manual transmission was supplied by the new transmission factory at Muncie, Indiana. 1933 was also the first year that branch assembly plants were built while knock down kits originated from Pontiac Assembly in Pontiac, Michigan, adopting a similar practice used by Chevrolet since 1917.

Series 603
The Pontiac Series 603 was the new designation used in 1934 and was the only model offered for 1934. Body style choices continued from the previous year and several appearance, mechanical and equipment changes were introduced. Vehicles equipped as Standard models could be identified with an Indian Brave's head in a circle on a teardrop base, while Deluxe equipment had an Indian Maiden hood ornament. Production began January 1, 1934 and a radio, called the "Air Chief" was on the list of options to include a front bumper, cigar lighter, clock, spotlights and a folding rear trunk rack.

Series 605
The 1935 Pontiac Series 605 Eight was now the senior sedan to the reintroduced Pontiac Standard Series 701-A and Deluxe Series 701-B Six and all shared the updated coachwork provided by Fisher Body, which shared an appearance with LaSalle and the Cadillac Series 60. The 4-door sedan was offered with doors that opened from the center to aid entry into the rear compartment, and the "Silver Streak" chrome trim piece was installed in the center of the grille and extended to the center top of the engine cover, and would be a Pontiac styling feature until 1960. An Indian maiden figurine was used for the hood ornament, along with twin rear taillights, twin windshield wipers, and a passenger compartment heater. Options included unusual features such as glove box smoker set with watch or a 30-hour mirror watch. A matching set of luggage was available for US$19.75 ($ in  dollars ). It shared some appearances with the Vauxhall Light Six.

Series 8BA
New standard features included retractable front and rear center armrests installed in the seats on mohair cloth upholstery. The independent front suspension was something GM called "Knee-Action" using trailing arms, an automatic choke for the carburetor, and a pressurized cooling system for the larger  engine with a 6.5:1 compression ratio. With 176,270 Pontiacs sold it was the sixth ranked in U.S auto sales with five choices for 2-door models and two choices for 4-door sedans.

Series 28
The 1937 Pontiac Deluxe Eight Series 28 was the first year all GM vehicles offered an optional "Dual Safety Electric Fan Windshield Defroster" combined with a passenger compartment heater. This device used an additional heater core installed behind the dashboard that rerouted coolant from the radiator to provide the necessary heat that would then be directed against the inside windshield surface. The passenger compartment heater was first offered optionally in 1926. The optionally listed price was US$7.90 ($ in  dollars ) while the heater for the Deluxe model was listed at US$17.95 ($ in  dollars ) 1937 was also the first year that the more upscale Deluxe Eight was built on the GM B platform. This allowed extra room needed so that a third passenger could be accommodated on the front bench seat with a manual transmission column shift.

Post-depression evolution of Pontiac
As the economy began to recover from the Great Depression, Pontiac in 1938 began to offer more choices in body styles while keeping the overall retail price of their eight cylinder products under US$1,500 ($ in  dollars ). Five 2-door coachwork choices to include the Sport Coupe with rumble seat, Business Coupe, Touring Sedan and Convertibles, and three 4-door choices were offered including a 4-door Convertible Sedan seating five passengers. The options list continued to grow with such items as a tenite shift lever ball for US$0.50 ($ in  dollars ), two passenger compartment heater choices for either the Master or Deluxe trim package, fog lights, license plate frames, seat covers, floor mats, cigar lighters and the rear view mirror was still an extra cost item at US$2.95 ($ in  dollars ). Calendar year production was recorded at 95,128. A new Factory Delivery Program was introduced where custom ordered vehicles would be delivered to the customers address once the car arrived at the selling dealership.

1939
1939 offered appearance changes as usual, such as different types of Indian hood ornaments for the Deluxe Eight and the entry-level Quality Six. The heater and windshield defroster was now called "Weather Chief", two types of radios were offered and continued to install the radio antenna in both running boards, an retractable metal sunroof called "Sunshine Roof" was available, and the gearshift was now permanently relocated to the steering column instead of being floor mounted, called "Safety Gearshift", allowing a third passenger on the front bench seat. Total Pontiac calendar-year production was documented at 170,726.

1940
For 1940, Oldsmobile and Pontiac had the distinction of having all three of General Motors' mainstream platforms. In 1940 Pontiac continued offering the Deluxe Eight Series 28which includes a engine and transmission imported from    Italy on the "B" platform, and the Torpedo on the C-platform. The new Pontiac C-body featured cutting-edge "torpedo" styling. Shoulder and hip room was over  wider, running boards were eliminated and the exterior was streamlined and  lower. When combined with a column mounted shift lever the cars offered true six passenger comfort. It was related to the Chevrolet Special Deluxe Fleetline.

1941
In 1941 the A-body and B-body were similarly redesigned. Consequently, Pontiac renamed its entire line-up "Torpedo", with models ranging from the low-end A-bodied Deluxe Torpedo (with a  wheelbase), the mid-level B-bodied Streamliner Torpedo (with a  wheelbase up  from the previous year), and the high-end C-bodied Custom Torpedo (with the same  wheelbase as the previous year).

1941 was the last year Pontiac offered a model with the GM C-body until the big "Clamshell" tailgate Pontiac Safari and Grand Safari station wagons of 1971-76.

1942
For 1942, the Torpedo name was assigned to the A-bodied Pontiac while the Streamliner became the B-bodied Pontiac.

1942-1948 

The Pontiac Streamliner is a full-sized car that was produced by Pontiac from the 1942 to the 1951 model years.

Streamliners used the larger B-body and, except for the station wagons, used fastback styling. The 1941 Super Streamliner models with folding center armrest were known as Chieftains in 1942. All Pontiacs looked lower, heavier and wider. Extension caps on the front doors lengthened the forward fender lines. The hood extended back to the front doors, eliminating the cowl. The grille, bumper and hood were widened and headlamps were further apart. Long horizontal parking lamps sat just above the vertical side grilles. The horseshoe shaped center grille had horizontal bars and a circular emblem in the middle of the upper main surround molding. The word Pontiac appeared on the hood side molding of six-cylinder models, while the moldings of the eight-cylinder cars said Pontiac Eight. After December 15, 1941, wartime "blackout" trim was used. All parts previously chrome plated were finished in Duco Gun Metal Grey.

With the end of the C-body Pontiac Custom Torpedo, station wagon production was transferred to the new Streamliner line. The final body work continued to be done at either the Hercules Body Company or at Ionia Manufacturing. The Streamliner station wagon ranged from $1,265 for a base Six to $1,340 for a Chieftain Eight, making it Pontiac's most expensive model. At  in overall length the 1942 Pontiac Streamliner station wagon also set a record for the longest Pontiac, this would not be exceeded until the 1959 Pontiac Star Chief and Bonneville.

The first postwar Pontiac available (September 13, 1945) was the Streamliner coupe, which remained the sole product for a time. The Chieftain trim level of 1942 was renamed the Deluxe trim level in 1946. Styling highlights of Pontiacs were wraparound bumpers, a massive 14-blade grille, new nameplates and concealed safe-light parking lamps. Streamliners could be identified by straight back Indian moldings on the rear hood ornament chrome beltline moldings and bright moldings on the "speedline" fender ribs. They also had longer front fender crown moldings and were generally larger in size. Lettering on hood emblems and badges placed forward of the "speedlines" identified Eights. Interior trim on passenger cars were in gray striped cloth. Station wagons had three seats in standard trim, two seats in Deluxe trim and used imitation leather upholstery and passenger car style interior hardware. Ranging in price from $1942 for a standard Six to $2,047 for a Deluxe Eight, Streamliner station wagons continued to be the most expensive Pontiac model. A total of 92,731 Streamliners were sold in 1946, accounting for over two thirds of all Pontiacs.

In 1947 the "Silver Streak" styling theme was continued, now with five bands of chrome on hoods. All Pontiacs had new grilles with four broad gently bowed horizontal bars. Hoods and fenders were protected by an inverted steer's horn shaped bar incorporating a die cast plate with indianhead relief. Interiors for sedans and coupes were redesigned with Berwicke beige panels for dashboard and windows. Windshield, door and garnish moldings were finished in Autumn Brown with dado stripe border moldings. All coupes and sedans were fastbacks with full-loop around window moldings. Streamliner station wagons ranged in price from $1,992 for a standard Six to $2,111 for a Deluxe Eight, again making them Pontiac's most expensive model. Sales of Streamliners totaled 128,660 in 1947, or nearly 56% of all Pontiacs sold.

In 1948 a new Pontiac styling included triple "Silver Streaks," a horizontal grille theme with vertical shaft, and round taillights. The word "Silver Streak" was carried on the sides of the hood with eights having an "8" placed between the two words. Streamliners were again larger and more expensive than other Pontiacs. All Streamliners, be they 2-door or 4-door fastbacks, or station wagons, now came standard or Deluxe. Deluxe models were distinguished by spear moldings on front fender, bright gravel guards, and chrome plated wheel discs on all cars except wagons. Deluxe interiors had two tone trims with pillow-and-tuft seatbacks, quarter sawed mahogany dash and window trim, electric glovebox door clocks, Deluxe steering wheels and other rich appointments. Standard Streamliner station wagons had tan imitation leather seats and Deluxe wagons had red upholstery of the same type. Station wagon prices ranged from $2,364 for a standard Six to $2,490 for a Deluxe Eight, making them Pontiac's most expensive model. In 1948 160,857 Streamliners were sold, accounting for nearly 66% of all Pontiacs.

Perhaps the biggest story of 1948 for Pontiac was the addition of an imported engine and transmission out of Italy. This changed the name for General Motors perhaps because their cars were not made fully domestic. In 1950 they decided to go back to domestic-made motor and transmission as a result of people protesting about having a car from “Italy”   As of 1948 only General Motors sold cars with fully automatic transmissions and the only other way to get one was to buy a higher priced Cadillac, Buick or Oldsmobile. Chevrolet would not introduce Powerglide until 1950, Ford FordoMatic until 1951 (Lincoln would start buying Hydramatics from GM in 1949), and Chrysler, PowerFlite on Imperials, until 1953. Hydramatic proved very popular with a total of 171,946 Pontiacs sold with it, or about 71% of all Pontiacs, and with 122,327 Streamliners equipped with it, or about 76% of all Streamliners, in its first year. Since Hydramatic was still only optional on Cadillac and Oldsmobile, and Dynaflow optional on Buick Roadmaster, given the total sales of Cadillac (50,619), Oldsmobile (173,661) and Buick Roadmaster (80,071), and the fact that Dynaflow was only introduced in the middle of the model year, this implies that probably over 40% of all cars sold with automatic transmissions in 1948 were Pontiacs.

1949-1951 

The 1949 Pontiacs featured low sleek envelope bodies. Streamliner coupes and sedans utilized the fastback B-body shell. Station wagons continued to be part of the Streamliner line. All of these cars came as standards or Deluxes. All station wagons and other standard models had small hubcaps. Standard coupes, sedans, and wagons were characterized by an absence of beltline trim along with use of rubber gravel guards and painted headlight rims. Deluxes had beltline moldings, chrome gravel guards and bright plated headlight doors. Silver Streak styling was seen again. Silver Streak lettering was placed above front fender spears on Deluxes and high on the fenders of standards. Eights had the number "8" between the two words. Most standard models had gray striped pattern cloth upholstery. Most Deluxes used dark gray broadcloth trims. Wagons were trimmed as before except imitation leather was only used on standard wagons. 1949 was the last year for wood-bodied station wagons, as production shifted to all-metal station wagons with woodgrain trim during the model year. Streamliner station wagons continued to be the most expensive Pontiac model, ranging in price from $2,543 for a standard Six to $2,690 for a Deluxe Eight.

The 1950 Pontiacs utilized the popular 1949 envelope bodies with revisions to trim and appointments. The horizontal center grille bar now wrapped around the corners of the body. Deluxes had a chrome body strip, chrome wheel rings, chrome headlight rings and stainless steel gravel guards. Eights had an "8" between the words. Streamliners (except for station wagons and sedan delivery trucks) had fastback styling. The price of Streamliner station wagons fell to a range of $2,264 for standard Sixes to $2,411 for Deluxe Eights due to the fact all-metal construction did not require final work be done at Hercules Body Company or Iona Manufacturing. Nevertheless, the Streamliner station wagon remained the most expensive Pontiac model.

The 1951 "Silver Anniversary" Pontiacs reflected 25 years of advanced engineering. A wing-shaped grille was seen and a Silver Streak theme continued. Streamliners again used the B-body shell with sloping fastbacks on coupes. Deluxes had chrome body strip, bright gravel guards, and headlight rings. Belt line moldings on all Deluxe passenger cars (not station wagons) had a dip behind the doors. Standard belt moldings were straight. A script plate reading Pontiac was used on Series 25 Sixes and on Series 27 Eights a different script read Pontiac Eight. In its final year, the Streamliner station wagon continued to be Pontiac's most expensive model, ranging in price from $2,470 for a standard Six to $2,629 for a Deluxe Eight. Pontiac's headquarter operations at the Pontiac, Michigan plant was responsible for 49.2% of all Pontiacs built in 1951.

With the demise of the Streamliner, 1951 would be the last time Pontiac offered a B-bodied car until 1959.

See also 

Pontiac Torpedo

References 

Coupés
Convertibles
Sedans
Station wagons
Full-size vehicles
Streamliner
Rear-wheel-drive vehicles
1950s cars
Cars introduced in 1942
Motor vehicles manufactured in the United States